The Communauté des maîtresses bouquetières et marchandes chapelières en fleurs (Community of mistress flower sellers and merchants of floral garlands) was a French Guild organisation for female fresh flower sellers within the city of Paris, active from August 1677 until 1791.

It was formatted in 1675, when Colbert issued a decree forcing the establishment of guilds in Paris, and was given its formal patent in August 1677.  

The profession of flower seller was a common profession for women in Paris.  They had the monopoly of selling flowers for all purposes in the capital of Paris.  Every flower seller had to spend at least four years as an apprentice of another flower seller before she could open her own shop.  She was banned from hiring men in her enterprise.  A report stated that the majority of those active in the profession where women of low economic circumstances and few became financially successful, merely making enough money to support themselves. 

It was one of only three guilds open to women in 17th-century Paris, the other two being the Maîtresses marchandes lingères and the Maîtresses couturières.

References
 Clare Haru Crowston,     Fabricating Women: The Seamstresses of Old Regime France, 1675–1791
 Elizabeth Hyde,     Cultivated Power: Flowers, Culture, and Politics in the Reign of Louis XIV

Guilds in France
Women in France
Historical legal occupations
History of Paris
1791 disestablishments in France
1675 establishments in France
Floristry
17th-century French businesspeople
18th-century French businesspeople